The men's marathon event at the 2000 Summer Olympics took place on 1 October 2000 in Sydney, Australia. One hundred athletes from 65 nations competed. The maximum number of athletes per nation had been set at 3 since the 1930 Olympic Congress. The event was won by Gezahegne Abera of Ethiopia, the nation's first victory in the event since winning three in a row from 1960 to 1968. Ethiopia's fourth gold medal in the men's marathon moved it out of a tie with France and the United States into sole possession of the most men's marathon gold medals. Ethiopia also became the first nation to have two medalists in the men's marathon in the same Games since South Africa did it in 1912, as Tesfaye Tola took bronze. Kenya won its third men's marathon medal in four Games with Erick Wainaina's silver. This made Wainaina the sixth man to earn two medals in the event, after his bronze in 1996.

Background

This was the 24th appearance of the event, which is one of 12 athletics events to have been held at every Summer Olympics. Returning runners from the 1996 marathon included all three medalists (gold medalist Josia Thugwane of South Africa, silver medalist Lee Bong-Ju of South Korea, and bronze medalist Erick Wainaina of Kenya) along with fourth-place finisher Martín Fiz of Spain, seventh-place finisher Steve Moneghetti of Australia, and eighth-place finisher Benjamin Paredes of Mexico. The Kenyan and Ethiopian teams were considered strong, but without any individual favorite. Khalid Khannouchi of Morocco had set the world record in 1999, but earlier in 2000 had changed citizenship to the United States. Abel Antón of Spain had won the last two world championships; he did compete in Sydney.

The Democratic Republic of the Congo, the Federated States of Micronesia, Slovakia, and Tajikistan each made their first appearance in Olympic men's marathons; there was also one Independent Olympic Athlete from East Timor. The United States made its 23rd appearance, most of any nation, having missed only the boycotted 1980 Games.

Qualification

Each National Olympic Committee was permitted to enter up to three athletes that had run 2:14:00 or faster during the qualification period. The maximum number of athletes per nation had been set at 3 since the 1930 Olympic Congress. If an NOC had no athletes that qualified under that standard, one athlete that had run 2:20:00 or faster could be entered.

Competition format and course

As all Olympic marathons, the competition was a single race. The marathon distance of 26 miles, 385 yards was run over a point-to-point route starting at the North Sydney Oval and finishing at the Olympic Stadium.

Records

These were the standing world and Olympic records prior to the 2000 Summer Olympics.

No new world or Olympic bests were set during the competition. The following national records were established during the competition:

Schedule

All times are Australian Eastern Standard Time (UTC+10)

Results

References

External links
IAAF results. Retrieved 22 August 2008.

Marathon, men
Marathons at the Olympics
2000 marathons
Men's marathons
Men's events at the 2000 Summer Olympics